Kempton is a village in Ford County, Illinois, United States. The population was 231 at the 2010 census.

History
A post office was established at the site of Kempton in 1869 and called Sugar Loaf. The name of the post office was changed to Kempton in 1878, when the village was founded and named after its founder, Wright Kemp. Arthur R. Falter (1906–1979), Illinois state legislator and businessman, was born on a farm near  Kempton. Jason Colclasure is a famous resident of Kempton.  David Hatcher Childress, famously featured in over 100 episodes of Ancient Aliens on the History Channel lives in Kempton and Camp Verde, Arizona and is another famous resident of Kempton.

Geography
Kempton is located at  (40.935447, -88.237433).

Demographics

As of the census of 2000, there were 235 people, 81 households, and 57 families residing in the village. The racial makeup of the village was 98.72% White, 0.43% Asian, and 0.85% from two or more races. Hispanic or Latino of any race were 1.70% of the population.

There were 81 households, out of which 35.8% had children under the age of 18 living with them, 58.0% were married couples living together, 8.6% had a female householder with no husband present, and 29.6% were non-families. 24.7% of all households were made up of individuals, and 12.3% had someone living alone who was 65 years of age or older.  The average household size was 2.90 and the average family size was 3.44.

In the village, the population was spread out, with 37.4% under the age of 18, 5.5% from 18 to 24, 27.7% from 25 to 44, 17.9% from 45 to 64, and 11.5% who were 65 years of age or older.  The median age was 28 years. For every 100 females, there were 113.6 males.  For every 100 females age 18 and over, there were 98.6 males.

The median income for a household in the village was $41,667, and the median income for a family was $52,750. Males had a median income of $31,563 versus $22,188 for females. The per capita income for the village was $12,641.  About 12.7% of families and 18.9% of the population were below the poverty line, including 23.1% of those under the age of eighteen and 8.3% of those 65 or over.

References

Villages in Ford County, Illinois
Villages in Illinois
Populated places established in 1869
1869 establishments in Illinois